Wilhelm-Langrehr-Stadion is a football stadium in the Havelse district of the Lower Saxon town of Garbsen. It is home to Regionalliga side TSV Havelse.

The stadium has a capacity of 3,500.

History 
TSV Havelse have played at Wilhelm-Langrehr-Stadion since 1933.

However, the stadium does not meet the requirements for the 3. Liga; therefore, TSV Havelse will play their home matches at the HDI-Arena in Hanover after being promoted to the 2021–22 3. Liga.

References 

TSV Havelse
Football venues in Germany